Forest Hill is an historic neighborhood spanning parts of Cleveland Heights and East Cleveland, Ohio, and is bordered to the north by Glynn Road, the south by Mayfield Road, by Lee Boulevard to the west and North Taylor Road to the east. Forest Hill was once the beloved summer home of oil magnate John D. Rockefeller and his family. John D. Rockefeller, Jr. purchased the estate from his father in 1923 and, with New York City architect Andrew J. Thomas, planned an upscale residential and commercial development featuring distinctive French Norman style architecture.  Although the Great Depression forced Rockefeller to suspend operations, following World War II others were drawn to Forest Hill to build comfortable colonial and contemporary ranch homes on the remaining open land.  Design principles of the Rockefeller-Thomas plan were extended to the later development and today Forest Hill is a rich tapestry of people, homes and gardens.

See also
Forest Hill Park (Ohio)

References

External links
Forest Hill Home Owners, Inc., a non-profit dedicated to preserving and promoting the integrity and history of the Forest Hill community.
Forest Hill Park
 Forest Hill Historic Preservation Society

Neighborhoods in Ohio
Cleveland Heights, Ohio
East Cleveland, Ohio
Historic districts in Cuyahoga County, Ohio
Historic districts on the National Register of Historic Places in Ohio
National Register of Historic Places in Cuyahoga County, Ohio